Events in the year 1832 in Norway.

Incumbents
Monarch: Charles III John

Events
 11 June - 25 June – The Norwegian ultramarathoner Mensen Ernst ran about 2,500 kilometres (1,600 mi) from Paris to Moscow in 14 days.

Arts and literature
 The newspaper Drammens Tidende is established.
 Det Dramatiske Selskab in Tromsø is founded.

Births
 19 March – Frantz Bruun, priest (d.1908)
 27 May – Laura Gundersen, actor (d.1898)
1 August – Andreas Olsen Sæhlie, farmer, distillery owner and politician (d. 1895). 
 13 October – Johan Wilhelm Eide, printer, publisher and newspaper editor (died 1896).
 8 December – Bjørnstjerne Bjørnson, writer and the 1903 Nobel Prize in Literature laureate (d.1910). 
 15 December – Wilhelm Christopher Christophersen, diplomat (d.1913)

Full date unknown
 Nils Henrik Bruun, engineer (d.1916)
 Jens Andersen Hagen, politician
 Anders Heyerdahl, violinist, composer and folk music collector (d.1918)
 Knud Knudsen, photographer (d.1915)
 Bernt Julius Muus, Lutheran minister (d.1900)

Deaths
 28 January - Carsten Tank, politician (b.1766)
 3 November - Gabriel Lund, merchant and representative at the Norwegian Constituent Assembly (b.1773)

See also

References